Dinkey Creek is a large stream in the southern Sierra Nevada, in Fresno County, California. It is a tributary of the North Fork Kings River, in turn part of the Kings River system which drains into the de-watered Tulare Lake bed.

It initially flows southwest, dropping over Dinkey Falls, then turning south a short distance below Dinkey Dome. It then flows past the community of Dinkey Creek and receives its largest tributary, Deer Creek, from the left.

The creek was named in 1863 by a group of hunters who were attacked there by a grizzly bear. The hunters' dog, Dinkey, tried to fight the bear, but was fatally injured. One of the men was then able to grab his gun and shoot the bear. They named the nearby stream Dinkey Creek to honor the dog's bravery.

Dinkey Creek Hydroelectric Project 

A hydroelectric project was proposed by the Kings River Conservation District (KRCD) in 1978 on Dinkey Creek, but was canceled just two months before the start of construction in 1986 because PG&E withdrew from the power purchase agreement. That was caused in part by delays caused by environmental litigation challenging parts of the plan, as well as a dispute between PG&E and the California Public Utilities Commission over related environmental issues.

The Dinkey Creek Inn in the community of Dinkey Creek is also located at  elevation. According to the Bureau of Reclamation; "Adverse environmental impacts would be expected in all categories assessed—botany,
wildlife, aquatic biology and water quality, recreation, and land use. In particular, a reservoir at Dinkey Creek would fundamentally alter the existing recreation-based community."

See also
List of rivers of California

References

Rivers of Fresno County, California